Natalya Kushch-Mazuryk (née Kushch, ; born 5 March 1983 in Donetsk, Ukraine) is a Ukrainian pole vaulter. She competed at the 2012 Summer Olympics.

Competition record

External links 

 

1983 births
Living people
Sportspeople from Donetsk
Ukrainian female pole vaulters
Athletes (track and field) at the 2012 Summer Olympics
Olympic athletes of Ukraine